Rugby Québec is the popular name of the Fédération de Rugby du Québec (formerly the Québec Rugby Union) which is the provincial governing body for the sport of rugby union in the Canadian province of Québec. The Fédération de Rugby du Québec is affiliated with the Canadian Rugby Union.

The Fédération de Rugby du Québec origins are hard to trace for two reasons. First, rugby union in Canada converged with and then later split from the game of Canadian football, often with rugby football unions representing both games, thus making an exact history hard to establish. Second, the Fédération de Rugby du Québec has not put a great emphasis on maintaining detailed historical records. This has led to gaps in its administrative and competition history and the lost information may never be known.

The Westmount Rugby Club traces its roots back to 1876 or 1878, and some sort of organized rugby has been played in Québec ever since. In the 1920s and 1930s many clubs made the transition to professional or semi-professional football. Regardless, several leagues were formed during the 1950s that were not associated with the Québec Rugby Union. This changed in the later 1960s and in the late 1970s the union officially changed its name to the Fédération de Rugby du Québec.

The FRQ has many differing levels and types of competition. There are two predominate competitions that have the longest historical record. The first is the Premier Championship Cup, which is awarded annually to the best rugby team in cup competition. This has also been known as the "Quebec Cup", Senior Cup, the First Division Cup, the A Division Cup and (formerly) the Standard Life Cup and can trace its origins back to the 1950s. The second oldest championship is the Intermediate Cup, awarded to the best club team in the second side cup competition. This has also been known as the Second Division Cup, the B Division Cup and the Des O'Neill Trophy.

Original clubs
As leagues in Montréal and the St. Lawrence Rugger and Cricket Association were formed, the first cohort of modern clubs was founded.

 Montreal Barbarians RFC - founded in 1953 and primarily located in the West Island of Montréal, this suburban club was Québec champions in 1957, 1963 and 1964, was First Division champs in 1997 to 1999 and 2002 to 2006 and, finally, was Second Division champs in 1997 to 1999 and 2001 to 2006.
 Westmount Rugby Club - possibly the oldest rugby club in North America, this team, once known as the Montreal (Rugby) Football Club, merged the Montreal Amateur Athletic Association and later became the Montreal Scottish RFC. After some members left to form the Wanderers and Barbarians, the club settled down in Westmount, and during its glory years in the 1960s challenged for many titles.
Town of Mount Royal RFC - founded in 1955, members of this club would later found the Montreal Irish Rugby Football Club. Situated in TMR and owners of its own clubhouse, this club once was a league powerhouse.
Montreal Wanderers RFC - founded in 1957 as an offshoot of Westmount Rugby Club, and now located in Verdun, this team was one of the premier teams in eastern Canada during the 1960s.
 Montreal Irish Rugby Football Club - founded in 1957, this urban based team later moved out to its own grounds and clubhouse in the rural suburbs of Montréal. Once a powerhouse, with First Division championships in 1958, 1959, 1969 and 1982, and a Second Division title in 1982. The club has more recently returned to prominence winning the Premier Division Championship in 2010, 2011, 2014, 2015, 2017 and 2018

First Expansion
The union began to expand in the 1970s and 1980s, with its first wave of new clubs. Additionally, for a good part of the 1970s several Ottawa based rugby teams regularly completed in the QRU, including the Ottawa Indians, Ottawa Irish, Ottawa Beavers, Ottawa Scottish and the Deep River Blues. Of particular importance was the entry of the Club de rugby Parc olympique into the FRQ, as it was the first primarily francophone team in the federation.

 Ormstown Saracens RFC - formed in 1972, this was the first rural based team in the union. They challenged for and won several championships during the 1970s and 1980s. The Ormstown Saracens Rugby Football Club wear red and navy blue.
 Ste-Anne-de-Bellevue RFC - known commonly as "SABRFC", Ste-Anne-de-Bellvue RFC originated around 1964 as the McDonald College (the agricultural school of McGill University) team situated in Ste-Anne-de-Bellevue on the westernmost part of the island of Montréal. Officially changed to Ste-Anne-de-Bellevue RFC in 1981, they have been the dominate team in the FRQ, winning 17 Senior titles (81, 83, 86, 87, 88, 89, 90, 91, 92, 93, 94, 07, 08, 09, 12, 13, 16) and 11 Intermediate titles (83, 86, 87, 89, 91, 92, 02, 09, 10, 11, 13). In 2013, SABRFC's three Senior Men's teams swept the FRQ Premiership, Reserves, and Division IV leagues.
 Montreal Grads RFC - originally the McGill Graduates, formed by grads of that university, this popular social side played at Trenholme Park in Notre Dame de Grace during the 1970s and 1980s, after which it disbanded, never winning a cup.
 Chateauguay River Rats RFC - this successful but short lived team played on the South Shore and won one Second Division title during its time in the 1980s.
 Beaconsfield RFC - formed in 1983 and playing in the West Island, this team took many of its talented players from the English language high schools of the area, and later progressed to the First Division. They won the 2nd Division championship in 1984 and 2007.
 St. Lambert Locks RFC - formed in 1984 this South Shore team won the Second Division title in 1984 and 1986, and has added Senior titles in 1995, 96 and 2000. Members of this club would form the Montreal Exiles.
 Club de rugby Parc olympique - formed in 1983 and originally situated at the training field at the Olympic Stadium, this highly competitive team won several titles. Its greatest significance was that it was the first francophone team in what was predominantly an anglophone organization. The formation of this team marked a true turning point in the history of rugby in Québec. 
 Brome Lake Ducks RFC - formed in 1986 and the first team to be situated in the Eastern Townships, this young club survived many enjoyable but hard fought seasons to eventually become a two time championship team (2005 and 2006.)

Recent Expansion
The FRQ experienced substantial growth in the past two decades, and has added many new clubs, especially because rugby now enjoys a much greater popularity in French language school boards.

Sherbrooke Abenakis RFC - founded in 1998
Barracudas Rugby de St-Jean sur Richelieu
Le Mirage de Gatineau - part of L’association de Rugby Régionale de l’Outaouais 
 Les Braves de Trois-Rivières - founded in 1993
Beauport Logers - which merged later with CR Quebec
Club de rugby les Nomades Laval-Laurentides-Lanaudières - founded in 1990, located in Laval
Les Patriotes du Vieux-Montréal - founded 2005
Club de Rugby de Québec - founded in 2001 as Club régional de Rugby de Québec, merged with Le Celtique de Ste-Foy in 2005. Won 3rd Division in 2003.
Rugby Club de Montréal - founded in 1995 and plays at Plateau Mont-Royal. They made it to the provincial final in 2004 and won the 1st division reserve and third finals in 2008 against SABRFC.
XV de Montréal - founded in 2010
Montreal Exiles - founded in 2011
Chelsea RFC - founded in 2005
Two teams, the Chateauguay Hammerheads and Hudson Highlanders, played at the turn of the century, but have folded.

Men's Quebec Champions 
1957 — Montreal Barbarians
1958 — Montreal Irish Rugby Football Club
1959 — Montreal Irish Rugby Football Club
1960 — Town of Mount Royal RFC
1961 — Town of Mount Royal RFC
1962 — Montreal Wanderers RFC
1963 — Montreal Barbarians
1964 — Montreal Barbarians
1965 — Montreal Wanderers RFC
1966 — Ottawa Beavers RFC
1967 — Montreal Irish Rugby Football Club
1968 —  Town of Mount Royal RFC  (2nd Division: Deep River Blues RFC)
1969 — Montreal Irish Rugby Football Club
1970 — Ottawa Beavers RFC
1971 — Montreal Wanderers RFC
1972 — Ottawa Beavers RFC
1973 — Montreal Irish Rugby Football Club
1974 — Ottawa Beavers RFC
1975 — Ottawa Irish RFC 
1976 — Ottawa Irish RFC 
1977 — Ottawa Beavers RFC
1978 — Montreal Wanderers RFC
1979 — Ottawa Irish RFC (2nd Division: Lynwood)
1980 — Ottawa Irish RFC
1981 — Ste Anne de Bellevue RFC
1982 — Montreal Irish Rugby Football Club
1983 — Ste Anne de Bellevue RFC
1984 — Town of Mount Royal RFC
1985 — Ormstown Saracens
1986 — Ste Anne de Bellevue RFC
1987 — Ste Anne de Bellevue RFC
1988 — Ste Anne de Bellevue RFC
1989 — Ste Anne de Bellevue RFC
1990 — Ste Anne de Bellevue RFC
1991 — Ste Anne de Bellevue RFC
1992 — Ste Anne de Bellevue RFC
1993 — Ste Anne de Bellevue RFC
1994 — Ste Anne de Bellevue RFC
1995 — Montreal Wanderers RFC
1996 — St-Lambert Locks
1997 — Montreal Barbarians
1998 — Montreal Barbarians
1999 — Montreal Barbarians
2000 — St-Lambert Locks
2001 — Montreal Barbarians
2002 — Montreal Barbarians
2003 — Montreal Barbarians
2004 — Montreal Barbarians
2005 — Montreal Barbarians
2006 — Montreal Barbarians
2007 — Ste Anne de Bellevue RFC
2008 — Ste Anne de Bellevue RFC
2009 — Ste Anne de Bellevue RFC
2010 — Montreal Irish Rugby Football Club
2011 — Montreal Irish Rugby Football Club
2012 — Ste Anne de Bellevue RFC
2013 — Ste Anne de Bellevue RFC
2014 — Montreal Irish Rugby Football Club
2015 — Montreal Irish Rugby Football Club
2016 — Ste Anne de Bellevue RFC
2017 — Montreal Irish Rugby Football Club
2018 — Montreal Irish Rugby Football Club
2019 — Town of Mount Royal RFC
2020 — No cup awarded due to Covid-19
2021 — No cup awarded due to Covid-19

References

External links
 Official Website

Rugby
Qu